Emir Sahiti (born 29 November 1998) is a Kosovan professional footballer who plays as a left winger for Prva HNL club Hajduk Split and the Kosovo national team.

Club career

Early career and Trepça '89
Sahiti is a product of youth team systems of Kosovan sides Ramiz Sadiku and Prishtina. In April 2014, Sahiti, together with his brother Suad was in the test to Belgian team Standard Liège, but unfortunately this test failed even though it was warned that they would sign contract. On 25 June 2015, he joined Football Superleague of Kosovo side Trepça '89.

Rabotnički
On 15 June 2015, Sahiti signed a two-year contract with Macedonian First Football League club Rabotnički and this transfer would become legally effective in August 2015. He found his brother Suad who was part of Rabotnički since September 2014. On 17 October 2015, Sahiti made his debut in a 0–0 home draw against Bregalnica Štip after being named in the starting line-up.

Loan at Hajduk Split II
On 3 February 2018, Sahiti joined Croatian Second Football League side Hajduk Split II, on a six-month-long loan with a buyout clause. On 10 March 2018, he made his debut in a 3–0 away defeat against Gorica after coming on as a substitute at 78th minute in place of Tonio Teklić.

Return to Hajduk Split
On 29 August 2018, Sahiti returned and signed a four-year contract with Croatian club Hajduk Split. Eleven days later, he made his debut with second team in a 2–0 home win against Kustošija after coming on as a substitute at 74th minute in place of Stanko Jurić. On 1 December 2018, Sahiti was named as a first team substitute for the first time in a league match against Rudeš. His debut with first team came on 23 February 2019 in a 0–0 home draw against Gorica after coming on as a substitute at 68th minute in place of Anthony Kalik.

Loan at Šibenik
On 21 July 2020, Sahiti joined Croatian First Football League side Šibenik, on a season-long loan. On 15 August 2020, he made his debut in a 2–1 away defeat against Rijeka after being named in the starting line-up.

Return from loan
On 23 June 2021, Sahiti returned to Croatian First Football League side Hajduk Split after agreeing to a four-year contract extension agreement and received squad number 77. On 17 July 2021, he made his debut against Lokomotiva after being named in the starting line-up and assists in his side's first goal during a 2–2 away draw.

International career

Youth
From 2015, until 2019, Sahiti has been part of Albania at youth international level, respectively has been part of the U19 and U21 teams and he with these teams played eleven matches and scored two goals.

Senior

On 28 December 2021, the Football Federation of Kosovo announced that Sahiti had decided to represent their national team. On 18 March 2022, Sahiti received a call-up from Kosovo for friendly matches against Burkina Faso and Switzerland, but due to injury, could not be part of the national team. His debut with Kosovo came on 9 June in the 2022–23 UEFA Nations League match against Northern Ireland after coming on as a substitute at 88th minute in place of Milot Rashica.

Personal life
Sahiti was born in Zemun, FR Yugoslavia to Albanian parents from Medveđa, and is the little brother of Kosovo international Suad Sahiti.

Honours
Hajduk Split
 Croatian Cup: 2021–22

References

External links

1998 births
Living people
People from Zemun
Kosovan footballers
Kosovo international footballers
Albanian footballers
Albania youth international footballers
Albania under-21 international footballers
Serbian footballers
Serbian people of Kosovan descent
Serbian people of Albanian descent
Kosovo Albanians
Association football wingers
Football Superleague of Kosovo players
KF Trepça'89 players
Macedonian First Football League players
FK Rabotnički players
First Football League (Croatia) players
Croatian Football League players
HNK Hajduk Split players
HNK Šibenik players
Kosovan expatriate footballers
Kosovan expatriate sportspeople in North Macedonia
Kosovan expatriate sportspeople in Croatia
Albanian expatriate footballers
Albanian expatriate sportspeople in North Macedonia
Albanian expatriate sportspeople in Croatia